The 2017–18 Valparaiso Crusaders women's basketball team represents Valparaiso University during the 2017–18 NCAA Division I women's basketball season. The Crusaders, led by sixth-year head coach Tracey Dorow, play their home games at the Athletics–Recreation Center as first-year members of the Missouri Valley Conference. They finished the season 13–18, 5–13 in MVC play to finish in a tie for eighth place. They advanced to the quarterfinals of the Missouri Valley women's tournament where they lost to Drake.

Roster

Schedule and results

|-
!colspan=9 style=| Exhibition

|-
!colspan=9 style=| Non-conference regular season

|-
!colspan=9 style=| Missouri Valley regular season
|-

|-
!colspan=9 style=| Missouri Valley Women's Tournament
|-

Source

See also
2017–18 Valparaiso Crusaders men's basketball team

References

Valparaiso
Valparaiso Beacons women's basketball seasons
Valparaiso Crusaders women's basketball
Valparaiso Crusaders women's basketball